Gennadi Skripnik (born 30 August 1962) is a former Uzbekistani football player.

Honours
Navbahor Namangan
Uzbekistan Cup winner: 1992
Uzbek League bronze: 1993, 1994
Uzbekistan Cup runner-up: 1993

References

1962 births
Living people
Soviet footballers
FC Polissya Zhytomyr players
Navbahor Namangan players
Uzbekistani footballers
FC Dynamo Stavropol players
Uzbekistani expatriate footballers
Expatriate footballers in Russia
Uzbekistani expatriate sportspeople in Russia
Russian Premier League players
FC Spartak-UGP Anapa players
Association football midfielders
Association football defenders